Chlamydia caviae is a bacterium that can be recovered from the conjunctiva of Guinea pigs suffering from ocular inflammation and eye discharge.  It is also possible to infect the genital tract of Guinea pigs with C. caviae and elicit a disease that is very similar to human Chlamydia trachomatis infection.  C. caviae infects primarily the mucosal epithelium and is not invasive.

C. caviae is markedly specific for Guinea pigs, as attempts to infect mice, hamsters, rabbits and gerbils have been unsuccessful, except for one experimentally infected gerbil.  The five known C. caviae isolates are indistinguishable, based on ompA gene sequence.

Genome structure
C. caviae has a relatively small genome that contains 1.17 Mbp with 998 protein coding genes.  Additionally, C. caviae strain GPIC contains an extrachromosomal plasmid, pCpGP1.

References

External links
 Chlamydiae.com
Type strain of Chlamydophila caviae at BacDive -  the Bacterial Diversity Metadatabase

Further reading

Chlamydiota